"Be My Love" is a popular song with lyrics by Sammy Cahn and music by Nicholas Brodszky. Published in 1950, it was written for Mario Lanza, who sang it with Kathryn Grayson in the 1950 movie The Toast of New Orleans. The song was nominated for the Academy Award for Best Original Song in 1950 but lost out to "Mona Lisa". He recorded it on June 27, 1950, with Ray Sinatra's orchestra.

Lanza's 1950 recording of the song (released by RCA Victor Red Seal Records as catalog number 10-1561) was his first million-seller, eventually selling over two million copies. It was on the Billboard charts for 34 weeks, going all the way to number one. It was the theme song for Lanza's radio program, The Mario Lanza Show (1951–52). It eventually became so firmly linked to him that he wearied of it and resorted to spoofing it in private.

Other versions
Ray Anthony's rendition of "Be My Love" (Capitol F1352) also charted in 1951, peaking at No. 13.
Connie Francis recorded "Be My Love" in 1964 for her motion picture Looking For Love and for the subsequent soundtrack album.
Mel Carter released a version in 1967 which reached #23 in the Adult Contemporary category.
 Cheryl Bentyne recorded it for her 2006 album, The Book of Love.

References

1950 songs
1951 singles
1959 singles
1967 singles
Songs with lyrics by Sammy Cahn
Songs with music by Nicholas Brodszky
Mario Lanza songs
Ed Townsend songs
Andy Williams songs
Number-one singles in the United States
Capitol Records singles